The Medal "For the Restoration of the Donbas Coal Mines" was a civilian state award of the Soviet Union established on September 10, 1947 by Decree of the Presidium of the Supreme Soviet of the USSR to recognise personal achievements by participants in the recovery of the coal mines of the Donets Basin.  The medal's statute was amended on July 18, 1980 by decree of the Presidium of the Supreme Soviet of the USSR № 2523-X.

Medal statute
The Medal "For the Restoration of the Donbas Coal Mines" was awarded to workers, clerks, engineering and business professionals, for outstanding work, high production performance and achievements in the recovery of the Donbas coal mines.

Recommendations for award of the Medal "For the Restoration of the Donbas Coal Mines" was made by business leaders, party and trade union organizations.  Lists of potential recipients were reviewed on behalf of the Presidium of the Supreme Soviet of the USSR by the Ministry of the Coal Industry of the USSR, the Ministry of Construction of the USSR or the Ministry of Chemical and Petroleum Industries of the western areas.

Award of the Medal "For the Restoration of the Donbas Coal Mines" was made on behalf of the Presidium of the Supreme Soviet of regional executive committees of Soviets in the communities of the award recipients.  The medal was to be worn with honour, to serve as an example of high awareness and observance of labour discipline and integrity in the performance of public duties.

The Medal "For the Restoration of the Donbas Coal Mines" was worn on the left side of the chest and when in the presence of other medals of the Soviet Union, located immediately after the Medal "For the Restoration of the Black Metallurgy Enterprises of the South".  When worn in the presence of Orders or medals of the Russian Federation, the latter have precedence.

Medal description
The Medal "For the Restoration of the Donbas Coal Mines" was a 32 mm in diameter circular brass medal.  On its obverse, in the left half, the relief image of a restored mine, a flag waving atop the tower; on the right side, the relief image of a helmeted miner facing left carrying a jackhammer on his right shoulder; in the background at center, the Sun with rays going all the way to the top of the medal; along the upper circumference, the relief inscription "For the Restoration of the Donbas Coal Mines"; along the lower circumference, the relief image of a five pointed star over a laurel wreath.  On the reverse, the relief image of the hammer and sickle over the inscription on two lines in prominent letters "LABOUR IN THE USSR - A MATTER OF HONOUR".
 
The Medal "For the Restoration of the Donbas Coal Mines" was secured by a ring through the medal suspension loop to a standard Soviet pentagonal mount covered by an overlapping 24 mm silk moiré ribbon with 0,5 mm black edge stripes and three 5 mm wide gold stripes separated by two 4 mm wide black stripes.

Recipients (partial list)
The individuals below were recipients of the Medal "For the Restoration of the Donbas Coal Mines".

Aleksandr Aleksandrovich Skochinsky
Aleksei Andreevich Naugolnykh
Ivan Vladimirovich Bobrov

See also
Awards and decorations of the Soviet Union

References

External links
Legal Library of the USSR
 The Russian Gazette

Civil awards and decorations of the Soviet Union
Awards established in 1947
1947 establishments in the Soviet Union
Energy in the Soviet Union